Lee Chiu-hsia (born 23 October 1950) is a Taiwanese middle-distance runner. She competed in the women's 800 metres at the 1972 Summer Olympics.

References

1950 births
Living people
Athletes (track and field) at the 1972 Summer Olympics
Taiwanese female middle-distance runners
Olympic athletes of Taiwan
Place of birth missing (living people)
Asian Games medalists in athletics (track and field)
Asian Games bronze medalists for Chinese Taipei
Athletes (track and field) at the 1970 Asian Games
Medalists at the 1970 Asian Games
20th-century Taiwanese women